UFL or ufl may refer to:

Chemistry:
 Upper flammable limit, the flammability limit describing the richest flammable mixture of a combustible gas

Colleges and universities:
 University of Florida, a public land-grant, space-grant, research university located in Gainesville, Florida
 Private University in the Principality of Liechtenstein, a private medical school located in Liechtenstein

Electronics:
 U.FL,  a miniature coaxial RF connector for high-frequency signals manufactured by Hirose Electric Group

Machine learning:
 Unsupervised feature learning, learning features from unlabeled data

Sports:
 UFL (video game), an upcoming association football simulation video game
 United Arab Emirates Football League, is the Emirati professional football league
 United Football League (1961–1964), an American football league that operated from 1961 to 1964
 United Football League (2009–2012), an American football league that operated from 2009 to 2012
 United Football League (Philippines), an association football league in the Philippines that operated from 2010 to 2016